Junior Senior is a 2005 Indian Malayalam-language comedy film directed by G. Sreekantan, starring Kunchacko Boban and Mukesh.

Plot
The movie was based on the life of a youngster Kichu, who is an ambitious young man who desires to become rich. He works for a wealthy man Manu who tries to cheat girls by making them fall into his trap. Manu tries to flatter Akhila who is also an ambitious young woman and an aspiring model and Kichu loves.

Cast
 Kunchacko Boban as Krishnakumar aka Kichu
 Mukesh as Manu
 Meenakshi as Akhila
 Renjini Krishnan as Sunanda
 Harisree Ashokan as Jeeva
 Sruthi Nair (Devika Rani)
 C. I. Paul as Renju's father
 Salim Kumar as Sathyan
 Vinayakan as Shivan
Narayanankutty as Sundaran

References

2005 films
2000s Malayalam-language films